Erast Pavlovich Garin (– 4 September 1980) was a Soviet and Russian actor, director and screenwriter. He was, together with Igor Ilyinsky and Sergey Martinson, one of the leading comic actors of Vsevolod Meyerhold's company and of the Soviet cinema. He was named People's Artist of the USSR in 1977. 

Garin was born in Ryazan as Erast Gerasimov. He started his acting career in 1919 in an amateur theatre of the Ryazan military district. In 1926 he finished his education in the experimental theatrical workshops of the People's Commissariat for Education. He always looked up upon Meyerhold and Michael Chekhov as his mentors, rejecting naturalistic acting techniques propagated by Konstantin Stanislavski and paying utmost importance to voice and gesture.

Garin worked with Meyerhold in his theatre until its dissolution in 1936. Among his triumphs was the part of Khlestakov in the 1926 production of The Government Inspector. The trance-like quality of his "grotesquely anxious" performances in Meyerhold's productions could be attributed to an expressionistic acting style.

Nikolay Akimov's Theatre of Comedy was the next theatre he worked in. In 1946 he gave up stage performances and concentrated on film acting. In 1941, he was awarded the Stalin Prize for the role of Tarakanov in the film Musical Story. Half-blindness prevented him from playing any major roles in the 1960s and 1970s.

Together with his wife Khesya Lokshina he was director of several films, for which he also contributed scripts. They adapted Mikhail Zoshchenko's novel Respected Comrade in 1930. Garin's memoirs, entitled With Meyerhold, appeared in 1974.

Filmography

As actor

 Lieutenant Kijé (Поручик Киже, 1934) - Adjutant
 Marriage (Женитьба, 1936) - Podkolesin
 Bezhin Meadow (Бежин луг, 1937)
 On the Frontier (На границе, 1938) - Volkov - Saboteur
 Musical story (Музыкальная история, 1940) - Cabbie Tarahkanov
 Boyevoy kinosbornik 7 (1941) - German soldier (segment "Eleksir bodrosti")
 Shveik readies for Battle (Швейк готовится к бою, 1942) - Francua
  The Wedding (Свадьба, 1944) - Epaminond Maksimovich Aplombov - the fiance
 Ivan Nikulin, Russian Sailor (Иван Никулин —  русский матрос, 1945) - Tikhon Spiridonovich
 Blue Mountain Land (Синегория, 1946)

 Cinderella (Золушка, 1947) - King
 Encounter at the Elbe (Встреча на Эльбе, 1949) - Tommy, a captain
 The Inspector-General (Ревизор, 1952) - Postmaster Ivan Kuzmich Shpekin
 Dzhambul (1953)
 Nesterka (1955) - Skolyar Samokhvalskiy
 Unfinished Story (Неоконченная повесть, 1955) - Koloskov
 The Enchanted Boy  (Заколдованный мальчик (озвучивание), 1955, Short) - Martin (voice)
 The Twelve Months (1956) - The Professor (voice, uncredited)
 The Girl Without an Address (Девушка без адреса, 1958) - Grandfather
 Soldiers Were Going (Шли солдаты, 1958)
 The Witch (Ведьма, 1958)
 Beloved Beauty (Краса ненаглядная, 1959) - Tsar (voice)
 The Adventures of Buratino (1959) - Toad Feldsher (uncredited)
 Russian Souvenir (Русский сувенир, 1960) - John Peebles, American philosopher
 Aquatic (Водяной, 1961)
 Alyonka (Аленка, 1962) - Konstantin Venyaminovich
 Dikie lebedi (Аленка, 1962) - The Bishop (voice)
 Neobyknovennyy gorod (1963)
 An Optimistic Tragedy (Оптимистическая трагедия, 1963) - Vozhachok
 Kain XVIII (Каин XVIII, 1963) - King Kain XVIII
 A Little Frog Is looking for His Father (Лягушонок ищет папу (озвучивание), 1965, Short) - (voice)
 The Ordinary Miracle (Обыкновенное чудо, 1965) - King
 Rasplyuev's Days of Fun (Весёлые расплюевские дни, 1966) - Kandid Tarelkin
 Two Days of Miracles (Два дня чудес, 1970)
 The Twelve Chairs (1971)
 Gentlemen of Fortune (Джентльмены удачи, 1971) - Nikolai Grigorevich Maltsev, archeologist
 If you are a Man (Если ты мужчина..., 1971)
 Yesli ty muzhchina... (1972) - Ulyanych
 Winnie-the-Pooh and a Busy Day (Винни-Пух и день забот (озвучивание), 1972, Short) - Eeyore (voice)
 Much Ado About Nothing (Много шума из ничего, 1973) - Verges
 Nylon 100% (Нейлон 100%, 1973) - Tamer
 Trading a Dog for a Steam Locomotive (Меняю собаку на паровоз, 1975)
 Olden times of Poshekhon (Пошехонская старина, 1975)
 Poshekhonskaya starina (1977)
 Tayna Dalekogo Ostrova, 1958 - Professor

As director
 Marriage (Женитьба, 1936), based on the eponymous play by Nikolay Gogol.
 Doctor Kalyuzhnyy (Доктор Калюжный, 1939)
 Prince and the Pauper (Принц и нищий, 1942)
 Sinogeria (Синегория, 1946)
 An Ordinary Miracle (Обыкновенное чудо, 1964), on the eponymous play by Evgeny Schwartz.
 Rasplyuev's Days of Fun (Весёлые расплюевские дни, 1966), based on Alexander Sukhovo-Kobylin's play Tarelkin's Death.

As script writer
 Marriage (Женитьба, 1936)
 An Ordinary Miracle (Обыкновенное чудо, 1964)
 Rasplyuev's Days of Fun (Весёлые расплюевские дни, 1966)

References

External links

  Biography
  Filmography
  Garin in the Encyclopedia of Saint Petersburg
 

1902 births
1980 deaths
People from Ryazan
People from Ryazansky Uyezd
Male screenwriters
20th-century Russian male writers
Soviet film directors
Soviet male film actors
Soviet male voice actors
Soviet screenwriters
Soviet theatre directors
Actors with disabilities
Honored Artists of the RSFSR
People's Artists of the RSFSR
People's Artists of the USSR
Stalin Prize winners
Recipients of the Order of the Red Banner of Labour
Burials at Vagankovo Cemetery